Pablo Pacheco Vidal (22 June 1908 - 2 May 1982) was a Peruvian football forward who played for Peru in the 1930 FIFA World Cup.

Pacheco played amateur club football with Universitario de Deportes. When the Universitario participated in the Peruvian Primera División for the first time in 1928, Pacheco scored the game-winning goal as the club defeated Alianza Lima to win the first Peruvian Clásico.

References

External links
FIFA profile

Peruvian footballers
Peru international footballers
Association football forwards
Club Universitario de Deportes footballers
1930 FIFA World Cup players
1908 births
1982 deaths